Executioner's Song is the first studio LP released by Canadian speed/thrash metal band Razor in 1985. The majority of the tracks were originally in pre-production in December 1984 and was released as a demo tape titled Escape the Fire.

Track listing

Notes
 The 1st pressing 1985 vinyl re-issue by Roadrunner Records feature large Viper Records center labels with small marketing Roadrunner logo. The features on the 2nd pressing is reversed
 The bootlegged 1992 CD edition by Reborn Classics contains the 1984 Armed & Dangerous EP. The track list on the back cover is not in the correct order. The song "Time Bomb" is misspelled as "Time Bond"
 The 2nd pressing remastered 2002 CD edition by Attic Records has "CINRAM" as no logotype in matrix/runout
 The 2009 CD edition by Attic Records was issued in a jewel case and digipak with added background
 Re-issued as a limited edition 12" vinyl in 2014 by Storm from the Past Records, limited to 500 copies. The catalogue number appears as SFTP 001 on sleeve spine and SFTP # 001 on vinyl label. It also comes with lyric insert
 Re-issued in 2019 by Hammerheart Records, limited to 1,000 copies

Credits 
Stace McLaren - vocals
Dave Carlo - guitars
Mike Campagnolo - bass
Mike Embro - drums

Production
Terry Marostega - Producer
Ray Statham - Cover illustration
Ed Stone - Remixing
Walter Zwol - Remixing
Garnet Giesbrecht - Art direction, Design
Lindsay Lozon - Photography

References

1985 debut albums
Razor (band) albums